Bas Thode Se Anjane is a Hindi drama that premiered on Doordarshan's National channel, (DD National) on 12 July 2016. The show is produced by Raujesh Kumar Jain under the banner of Krish Movies and stars Ali Hassan, Suhasi Goradia Dhami, Aniruddh Dave, Natasha Sinha, and Shyam Mashalkar.

Broadcast 

Bas Thode Se Anjane Doordarshan daily soap was launched on DD National. It aired from Monday to Friday from 12 July 2016 to 24 October 2016 at 1.30 P.M.

Cast

  Ali Hassan as Sankalp
 Suhasi Goradia Dhami as Sambhavi Agarwal
 Aniruddh Dave as Manav
 Natasha Sinha as Prabha Abhi Awasthi 
 Neetu Singh as Shyamli Awasthi
 Deepali Sahay as Timli Awasthi
 Tripti Singh as Vimli Awasthi
 Shyam Mashalkar as Bhushan Agarwal
 Sagar Saini as Abhi Awasthi
 Rishikesh Ingley as Harry
 Unknown as Martha
 Sagarika Neha as Vibha Awasthi
 Unknown as Nisha Awasthi
 Unknown as Advocate Malini Abhi Awasthi
 Unknown as Netritwa
 Vandana Singh as Rozy

References

External links
 

Indian comedy television series
Indian television sitcoms
2016 Indian television series debuts
DD National original programming